Anti-Fujimorism is a political movement characterized by an opposition to Fujimorism, the ideology of former Peruvian president Alberto Fujimori and his daughter Keiko Fujimori. The movement has broad support across the political spectrum, with many opponents from the left, center, and right coming out against Fujimorism. The movement properly organized itself after the 1992 Peruvian coup d'état, in which Fujimori illegally gave himself additional powers by unilaterally dissolving the Congress of Peru. Throughout the rest of his reign (1992–2000), the movement strongly opposed the increasingly authoritarian and populist measures of his government. After the end of his rule in November 2000, the anti-Fujimorist coalition has been one of the most influential oppositionary voices in Peruvian general elections, opposing the Fujimorist political parties Peru 2000 in 2000, Cambio 90 – New Majority in 2001, Alliance for the Future in 2006, and Popular Force in 2011, 2016, and 2021.

Anti-Fujimorism has been described as "the largest informal political group" or "the largest political party" in Peru, given its impact in the consecutive defeats of the Fujimorist candidate Keiko Fujimori (daughter of Alberto Fujimori) in the presidential elections of 2011, 2016, and 2021, all three by slim margins. The movement is also against the pardon of Alberto Fujimori (a campaign promise of Keiko), who was convicted of human rights abuses and corruption, among other crimes.

Adherents of anti-Fujimorism claim their goal to be "defending democracy and national dignity" and "[ensuring] compliance with the law and the Constitution." They also accuse Fujimorists of seeking to "exercise power without control or supervision" and "evading justice." Critics of anti-Fujimorism claim that it is "based on hatred and revenge" and involves "subversive" political groups.

See also
 No to Keiko

References

Fujimorism
Political movements